Sizakele Petunia Mzimela, known as Siza Mzimela, is credited as the first black woman to start an airline. She currently holds a position as Transnet Freight Rail Chief Executive Officer. Ms. Mzimela is charged with ensuring that TFR is the author of globally competitive regional freight system that enables sustained growth and diversification of the region’s economies, enables economic growth by lowering the cost of doing business, and ensures reliable freight system through on-time scheduling and execution of train services. She was listed as one of Forbes magazine's most powerful women in 2011.

Career
Mzimela joined the South African Airways (SAA) national airline in January 1996 as a research analyst. She subsequently headed global sales and SAA's Voyager loyalty programme, serving as CEO from 1 April 2010 until 8 October 2012. She has also served as the first female member of the board of governors of the International Air Transport Association, based in Miami, Florida, USA.

She was appointed interim CEO of South African Express in April 2017, which was forced into business rescue on 28 April 2020 by its creditors.

On 1 April 2020, Mzimela joined Transnet as CEO of its freight rail division. She is currently the Vice President of SARA (Southern Africa Railways Association) She also chairs the board of JSE-listed company Cargo Carriers and services as Non-Executive Director on the board of JSE-listed technology company, Etion Limited. Additionally, Siza serves on the board of reinsurance company, Africa Reinsurance Corporation.

Fly Blue Crane

Fly Blue Crane was launched on 1 September 2015 by Mzimela and two ex-SAA colleagues, Jerome Simelane and Theunis Potgieter. One year later, it has grown to employ over 100 people. Mzimela said at the launch of Fly Blue Crane that she hopes to expand the airline to include routes to Botswana, Namibia, Zimbabwe and the Democratic Republic of Congo.

Fly Blue Crane became insolvent in 2016; operations were suspended on 3 February 2017.

References

Living people
South African women business executives
South African women company founders
Year of birth missing (living people)
Women chief executives
South African chief executives
21st-century South African businesswomen
21st-century South African businesspeople
South African corporate directors